In computer hardware, a controller may refer to:

 Memory controller, a unit that manages access to memory
 Game controller, a device by which the user controls the operation of the computer
 Host controller
 Network controller
 Graphics controller or video display controller
 SCSI host bus adapter
 Network interface controller (NIC)
 Parallel port controller
 Microcontroller unit (MCU)
 Keyboard controller
 Programmable Interrupt Controller
 Northbridge (computing)
 Southbridge (computing)
 Universal asynchronous receiver/transmitter (UART) communications controller chip
 Peripheral DMA controller
 Floppy disk controller
 Disk array controller, also known as a RAID controller, a type of storage controller
 Flash controller, or SSD controller, which manages flash memory
 Terminal Access Controller
 IBM 2821 Control Unit, used to attach card readers, punches and line printers to IBM System/360 and IBM System/370 computers
 IBM 270x and IBM 37xx, used for telecommunications
 IBM 3271, 3272, 3271, and 3174, used to attach terminals (display devices)
 MIDI controller
 Programmable logic controller